Barbot may refer to:

Clément Barbot (1914–1963), aide to Haitian President Francois Duvalier
Joseph-Théodore-Désiré Barbot (1824-1879), French operatic tenor
Matt Barbot, Nuyorican playwright
Oxiris Barbot, American Commissioner of Health of the City of New York
Sammy Barbot (born 1949), stage name of Jacques Édouard Barbot, Caribbean entertainer, singer and television presenter
 Stanley Barbot (1962–2009), Haitian-American radio personality 
Vivian Barbot (born 1941), Canadian teacher, activist, and politician
 Roboexotica (a cocktail robot aka barbot festival)

See also
 Barbat (disambiguation)